Gillett, Colorado (also spelled Gillette) is a ghost town located near Cripple Creek in Teller County, Colorado, United States. It is famous for being the site of the only bullfight ever held in the US.

History
Gillett was reportedly a family-friendly community and included several churches. The nearby mines contributed to the boom of the town. In May of 1896, Following a fire that destroyed their ballpark, the professional minor league baseball team from Cripple Creek that participated in the Colorado State League moved to Gillett. The team folded at the end of the month. In 1895, the only bullfight held in the US took place in Gillett. 50,000 people, some of them celebrities from the US and Mexico, attended. The bulls and bullfighters traveled to Gillett from Mexico; the trip possibly caused the bulls to become over tired and irritable. The bullfight soon turned into a riot. After the riot was quelled, the bulls were taken to slaughter, and their meat was given to the poor. During the first decade of the 1900s, the town began a slow decline and was completely or mostly abandoned by the 1940s. On June 16, 1965, a flash flood that delivered 14 inches of rain to the area between Pueblo and Denver flooded a small abandoned community dam above the valley where the town stood. The resulting flood washed away most of the town's ruins. The only remnants of the city are small parts of a church's walls (in the 1940s, only the roof had collapsed), located in what is now a hayfield to the west of the highway; the jail, located beside a few abandoned residential houses at a road bend; and a couple of fire hydrants.  Gillett also has a small airstrip that runs parallel with Colorado State Highway 67.  Soldiers stationed at nearby Fort Carson (Colorado Springs) used to land and subsequently conduct high altitude survival training from there. Oddly enough, during the time when cattle mutilations were the most prolific in the southwest and near the Cripple Creek area in 1976, a motorist managed to take a picture of an unmarked helicopter (unmarked helicopters were often seen before and after the mutilations) close to the Gillett airstrip.

Geography
The former site of Gillett rests in a valley beside a highway near Cripple Creek in Teller County, Colorado, United States. Very little of the town remains.

References

Ghost towns in Colorado
Former populated places in Teller County, Colorado